Nathan Idumba Fasika was born in (28 February 1999) is a Congolese professional footballer who plays as a defender for South African Premier Division club Cape Town City FC. He represents the DR Congo national team.

International career
Fasika debuted with the DR Congo in a 1–0 2020 African Nations Championship win over Republic of the Congo on 17 January 2021.

References

External links

2001 births
Living people
Footballers from Kinshasa
Democratic Republic of the Congo footballers
Democratic Republic of the Congo international footballers
Association football defenders
Linafoot players
21st-century Democratic Republic of the Congo people
Democratic Republic of the Congo A' international footballers
2020 African Nations Championship players
Cape Town City F.C. (2016) players
Democratic Republic of the Congo expatriate sportspeople in South Africa
Democratic Republic of the Congo expatriate footballers
Expatriate soccer players in South Africa